Richard Humann (born 1961) is a New York City-based American neo-conceptual artist. His art delves deep into concept and ideas, and he uses a multitude of materials to create his installations, sculptures, videos, and sound projects. Richard Humann's influences are as broad ranging as from Donald Judd, and Nam June Paik, to Jonathan Borofsky. His artwork bears conceptual similarities and to that of Joseph Kosuth, Sol LeWitt, Lawrence Weiner, Edward Ruscha, and Robert Morris.

Critics have described his career as; “Humann’s installation and environmental art pre-dates by half a decade the forceful movement in that direction that occurred in Williamsburg from 1989 and into the 90s. To me, it seems to fair to say that northern Brooklyn installation art begins with Richard Humann”, and “Humann’s experimental approach led to works that juxtapose historically sanctioned self-exploration with the tightening noose of academic appropriation and the globalized international art market.” “Humann translates language from a transportation of thought into a thought to be perceived. He objectifies language, confronting our symbolic codes as simple and physical, and thus objective—as objects to be seen rather than conveyances to be seen through.”

Biography

Richard Humann grew up in Stony Point, New York, which is located in the lower Hudson Valley region of New York State. He began his formal art training at an early age with the painter, George White. Later, he graduated from Harriman College, where he earned a degree in art. In 1985, Richard moved to Greenpoint, Brooklyn, where he still lives and maintains his art studio. He divides his personal time between Brooklyn, and Woodstock, NY.

Exhibitions

Major exhibits 

Major exhibits include Dia Art Foundation, New York, NY (1988,Three Doors); Tampere Art Museum, Tampere, Finland ( 2004, Delicate Monster); Kemi Art Museum, Kemi, Finland (2003, Where Troubles Melt Like Lemon Drops); Museum of Contemporary Art, Sonoma, CA (2002, New York Art); Museo Cristóbal Gabarrón, Murcia, Spain (2007, Revolutions) His work has appeared and been reviewed in the following publications: The New York Times, The Washington Post, The Village Voice, Dwell, New York Arts, ArtReview, The New Yorker, Sculpture, American Craft, Flash Art, Artforum and Art in America. His current bassword miniatures are featured in American Craft magazine (2007). His work has also been shown at galleries in the United States and abroad including Lance Fung Gallery, New York, NY; Gallery St. Gertrud Malmo, Sweden; Kunst+Technik, Berlin, Germany; Leo Kamen Gallery, Toronto, Canada; Project Row Houses, Houston, TX; Gasworks Gallery, London, England; Cornerhouse, Manchester, England; L Gallery, Moscow, Russia; Planet Art Gallery, Cape Town, South Africa; Samzie Space, Seoul, Korea; Elga Wimmer Gallery, New York, NY; Voorkamer Gallery, Lier, Belgium; and Corridor Gallery, Reykjavik, Iceland.

Humann has received awards from the New York State Council on the Arts and the Brooklyn Arts Council. He is also a recipient of the Pollock-Krasner Foundation award.

Selected solo exhibitions

Selected group exhibitions

References

External links 
 Art in America,  June, 2001  by Sarah Valdez
 Pierogi 2000
 New York Arts Magazine
 Ghost-Trails.com
 elgawimmer.com
 http://www.artslant.com/global/artists/show/10079-richard-humann
 https://artfacts.net/exhibition/richard-humann-the-quiet-argument/20918
 http://www.giganticartspace.com/artist.html?id=108622924017300&ex=06&from=personalspace

Fluxus
American conceptual artists
1961 births
Living people
People from Stony Point, New York
People from Greenpoint, Brooklyn
People from Woodstock, New York